Volvo Penta is a Swedish marine and industrial engine manufacturer, a joint stock company within the Volvo Group. Volvo Penta employs approximately 1,600 people, of which about 800 are in Sweden. Volvo Penta was founded as Penta in 1907 with the production of its first marine engine, the B1. The Penta company soon became an established internal combustion engine manufacturer, which in 1927 delivered the engine for Volvo's first passenger car.

Volvo acquired Penta in 1935 and Volvo Penta has been part of the Volvo Group since then. It now provides internal combustion engines (ICEs) and complete power systems to the marine industry, power-generating equipment, and similar industrial applications. The business also manufacturers sterndrive and inboard drive systems such as the Volvo Penta IPS.

History
In 1868, engineer Johan George Grönvall, also known as John G. Grönvall, founded a mechanical workshop and foundry in Skövde, Sweden.  The company became limited in 1875, known as Sköfde Gjuteri och Mekaniska Verkstad or simply Gjuteriet. Products ranged from pots and vents to stoves and brewery equipment. Soon Gjuteriet also started manufacturing agricultural equipment and equipment for sawmills.

The company expanded heavily in the early 1900s, and started producing steam engines and water turbines for hydraulic power plants. In 1907, a very fruitful co-operation with the Stockholm-based engineering company Fritz Egnell began, with a one-cylinder 3 hp compression ignition engine. The engine was simply named B1 - but a five-man committee was set to find a name that would catch on. The committee failed to agree on a catchy name, but because it had five members, settled for Penta.

In 1916, Egnell bought the company and the name changed to AB Pentaverken. Production was concentrated on engines, mostly for maritime applications. The years immediately after World War I were economically harsh, but a new product was introduced: a small two cylinder U2 outboard engine designed by Carl-Axel Skärlund. The U2 was slightly improved in 1926, and renamed U21 and remained in production until 1962. The U2/U21 was a great success and exported worldwide. In many countries, U21 is still synonymous with outboard engine.

In 1925, Penta was approached by Assar Gabrielsson, the founder of Volvo, who needed an engine for the first Volvo automobile. Penta then designed the four cylinder 28 hp side valve Typ DA engine for the Volvo ÖV 4. In 1935, Penta became a subsidiary of Volvo.

Current operations

Marine engines and complete marine propulsion systems
Volvo Penta has introduced several industry-first innovations to the marine engine market, including the sterndrive unit, contra-rotating propellers Duoprop, and Forward Drive. In 2005, Volvo Penta launched the first IPS engine, a new "pod type" boat drive system with counter rotating forward-facing propellers operated by a joystick. Its engines are used by more than 140 boat manufacturers including Fairline Boats, Sunseeker, Riviera, Four Winns, Sea Ray, Hanse, Bavaria and Cranchi. In conjunction with Volvo owned CPAC Systems, Volvo Penta and Yamaha Motor signed an agreement involving technological partnership in December 2010. Volvo Penta have a strong presence in the Marine Commercial segment, many passenger ferries, workboats, Military vessels,dive support vessels and fishing vessels utilise Volvo Penta engines for propulsion, power generation or auxiliary equipment such as bow thrusters. Most recently Volvo Penta has been the number one choice of propulsion and power generation for offshore wind farm vessels aka Crew transfer vessel (CTV). Operators can appreciate the reliability and performance from Volvo Penta engines and IPS propulsion systems. With ever demanding focus on reducing CO2 emissions, Volvo Penta have released to market a hybrid solution for the CTV market utilising electric motors mated to IPS drives.

Industrial engines
The company sells its engines to a variety of users, including many generator manufacturers such as Aggreko Sdmo, Genpower, Kohler and Shanghai Dingxin Electric Group. Its engines are also used in mining equipment and stone-crushing machinery.

Manufacturing bases
The company has a number of manufacturing bases for diesel engines at Vara, Sweden; Lingang, China; and Lexington, Tennessee, United States, for all gasoline engines and sterndrives. Volvo Penta operates worldwide and has around 4,000 dealers in 130 countries.

References

External links
Official Volvo Penta website

Penta
Motor vehicle engine manufacturers
Diesel engine manufacturers
Marine engine manufacturers
Gas engine manufacturers
Electrical generation engine manufacturers
Manufacturing companies established in 1868
Engine manufacturers of Sweden
Swedish companies established in 1868